The 2009 Karshi Challenger was a professional tennis tournament played on outdoor hard courts. It was the third edition of the tournament which was part of the 2009 ATP Challenger Tour. It took place in Qarshi, Uzbekistan between 17 and 23 August 2009.

Singles entrants

Seeds

 Rankings are as of August 10, 2009.

Other entrants
The following players received wildcards into the singles main draw:
  Rifat Biktyakov
  Jakhongir Jalalov
  Sergey Shipilov
  Vaja Uzakov

The following players received entry from the qualifying draw:
  Ričardas Berankis
  Murad Inoyatov
  Sadik Kadir
  Mikhail Ledovskikh
  Patrick Taubert (as a Lucky Loser)

Champions

Singles

 Rainer Eitzinger def.  Ivan Sergeyev, 6–3, 1–6, 7–6(3)

Doubles

 Sadik Kadir /  Purav Raja def.  Andis Juška /  Deniss Pavlovs, 6–3, 7–6(4)

External links
Official website
ITF Search 

Karshi Challenger
Karshi Challenger